Wild Kentucky Skies is the second album released by country music artist Marty Brown. The album was released by MCA Records on March 16, 1993. This album produced his only charting single, "It Must Be the Rain", which only reached #74 in the U.S. and #62 in Canada.

Critical reception
The album was praised by Allmusic critic Brian Mansfield for "possessing qualities that people both hate and love about country music." He compares several songs to those of the Everly Brothers and calls the album "Pure country without being a purist."

Track listing
All tracks written by Marty Brown unless indicated otherwise.
 "It Must Be the Rain" - 3:46
 "Let's Begin Again" (Hank DeVito, Danny Flowers) - 3:10
 "God Knows" - 4:17
 "No Honky Tonkin' Tonight" - 2:55
 "I'd Rather Fish Than Fight" - 2:35
 "Honey I Ain't No Fool" - 4:20
 "I Don't Want to See You Again" (Jackson Leap) - 4:09
 "Freight Train" - 4:55
 "She's Gone" - 4:59
 "Wild Kentucky Skies" - 4:28
Performed live
Arranged by Glen D. Hardin

Personnel
As listed in liner notes.
Sam Bacco - tambourine, tympani, prepared piano
Richard Bennett - guitar
Marty Brown - lead vocals, guitar, harmony vocals
Terry Crisp - steel guitar
Dan Dugmore - steel guitar, dobro
Glen Duncan - fiddle
Stuart Duncan - fiddle
Buddy Emmons - steel guitar
Dave Hoffner - keyboards, piano
David Hungate - bass guitar
John Barlow Jarvis - piano
Larrie Londin - drums
Larry Marrs - harmony vocals
Bill Miller - courting flute, rain stick
Rocky Schnaars and Ken Hutton - vocal effects, tubes and hoses
Harry Stinson - harmony vocals
Marty Stuart - mandolin
Billy Thomas - drums
Joy Lynn White - harmony vocals

Sources

CMT
AOL Music

1993 albums
Marty Brown (singer) albums
MCA Records albums
Albums produced by Richard Bennett (guitarist)
Albums produced by Tony Brown (record producer)